Muqur (also spelt Moqur) is a district in the southwest of Ghazni province, Afghanistan. Its population was estimated at 70,900 in 2002, of whom 19,538 were children under 12.

On 8 May 2016, a vehicular accident on a stretch of the Kabul-Kandahar Highway occurred in the district, killing 73. Two buses travelling from Kabul to Kandahar collided with a fuel tanker. The stretch of highway in this district is reportedly dangerous due to Taliban presence, and the vehicles were speeding to avoid ambush.

Divisions 
The district is divided in four main areas:
 Khoband
 Khodzaie
 Gadakhel
 Manger Khel

Agriculture 
Main crops include wheat, alfalfa, peas, beans and honey melons. Animal husbandry includes sheep, goats, domestic poultry and a limited number of donkeys and horses.

Politics and Governance

Geography

Healthcare

Education

Demographics

Infrastructure

Natural Resources

External links
 Map of Muqur (PDF)

References

Districts of Ghazni Province